The 2020 McDonald's All-American Boys Game was an all-star basketball game that was scheduled to be played on Wednesday, April 1, 2020 at the Toyota Center in Houston, Texas, home of the Houston Rockets. The game's rosters featured the best and most highly recruited high school boys graduating in the class of 2020. The game would have been the 43rd annual version of the McDonald's All-American Game first played in 1977.  Due to the impact of the COVID-19 pandemic, the game was cancelled.

The 24 players were selected from 2,500 nominees by a committee of basketball experts. They were chosen not only for their on-court skills, but for their performances off the court as well.

Rosters
When the rosters were announced on January 23, 2020, North Carolina had the most selections with four, while Duke had three, and Kentucky had two. At the announcement of roster selections, only 14 schools were represented and had 4 players uncommitted. The official East and West sides were not announced for a couple weeks.

Team East

Team West

^undecided at the time of roster selection
~undecided at game time
Reference

References

McDonald's All-American Boys Game
Basketball in Atlanta
McDonald's All-American
McDonald's All-American